Lele is a village development committee in Lalitpur District in the Bagmati Zone of central Nepal. At the time of the 1991 Nepal census it had a population of 6928 living in 1245 individual households, but the population has increased greatly since then.

Lele is 14 km (1 hour by bus and about 30 minutes by bike) from Lagankhel, Patan, the main city of Lalitpur. It is located in a small valley within the Kathmandu Valley. The river is the main source for irrigation for the farmland.

Lele is a gateway to southern villages of Lalitpur including Bhardeu, Nallu, Chaughare and Gotikhel, and a centre of tourism.

Lele was an important site under the ancient Licchavi dynasty; stone pillars dating to that era can be found there.

Industry and agriculture
There are dairies, mines, a brick factory, a bakery, and other businesses.

Agriculture is the main occupation of people residing in Lele village. In the past people used to do agriculture by traditional methods. But nowadays organic methods are used. Tomato production is increasing. Other crops include potatoes, rice, wheat, barley, onions, garlic, spinach, cauliflower, cabbages, pumpkins, lettuce, ginger, and bitter gourds. Mushroom farming is the most popular, and uses modern techniques.

Temples and gumbas
Sukra Bhagwan Mandir, Lapse
Devi than mandir, Lapse
Saraswati Kunda
Tika Bhirab
Tileshwor Mahadev
Ganga Jamuna
Jayal Kumari, Bal Kumari
Champeshwori
Maneshwori
Manakamana
Phulchoki Mandir (Located near Manakamana which is exactly located at Lele 3, Kavre)
Pashupati Mandir
 Godar kulmandir (south 1 km far from champeswori temple )

Schools and colleges 
Saraswoti Higher Secondary School(10+2)
Ganga Jamuna English Secondary School
Amar Kanti School
Maneshwori Prathamik Vidyalaya
Deurali Prathamik Vidyalaya

Health facilities 
Anandaban Hospital
The Leprosy Mission Nepal
Lele Health Post
Jana chhetana Gaun Ghar Clinic, Lapse

PIA Memorial Park 
The Lele PIA Memorial Park was constructed in memory of the 167 people who lost their lives in the 1992 Pakistan International Airlines plane crash at Bhatti Danda.

References

External links
UN map of the municipalities of Lalitpur District

Populated places in Lalitpur District, Nepal